is a passenger  railway station located in the town of Manazuru, Kanagawa Prefecture, Japan, operated by the East Japan Railway Company (JR East).

Lines
Manazuru Station is served by  the Tōkaidō Main Line, and is located 95.8 rail kilometers from Tokyo Station.

Station layout
Manazuru Station has a single island platform serving two tracks, connected to the station building by a footbridge. The station has a "Midori no Madoguchi" service counter.

Platforms

Station history
Manazuru Station was opened on July 11, 1887 for both freight and passenger service on the Atami Line of the Japan National Railways. With the opening of the Tanna Tunnel, the Atami Line became the Tōkaidō Main Line on December 1, 1934. Regularly scheduled freight services were discontinued in 1970, and parcel services by 1972. Freight services were resumed in March 1987. With the dissolution and privatization of the JNR on April 1, 1987, the station came under the control of the East Japan Railway Company. Automated turnstiles using the Suica IC Card system came into operation from November 18, 2001. Freight services were discontinued again in April 2007

Passenger statistics
In fiscal 2019, the station was used by an average of 3,133 passengers daily (boarding passengers only).

The passenger figures (boarding passengers only) for previous years are as shown below.

Surrounding area
Manazuru Town Hall
Manazuru Municipal Manazuru Junior High School
 Manazuru Municipal Manazuru Elementary School

See also
List of railway stations in Japan

References

Yoshikawa, Fumio. Tokaido-sen 130-nen no ayumi. Grand-Prix Publishing (2002) .

External links

Official home page.

Manazuru, Kanagawa
Railway stations in Japan opened in 1887